Arenga wightii is a species of flowering plant in the family Arecaceae. It is found almost exclusively in India. It is threatened by habitat loss.

References

External links

 
 http://www.palmpedia.net/wiki/Arenga_wightii
 http://www.biotik.org/india/species/a/arenwigh/arenwigh_en.html

wightii
Flora of India (region)
Vulnerable plants
Taxonomy articles created by Polbot